The Samuel Gaut House is a historic house in Somerville, Massachusetts.  The -story wood-frame house was built c. 1855 for Samuel Gaut, a baker, and is a well-preserved example of a typical Italianate house.  It is three bays wide with a typical Italianate center gable, which is studded with brackets and has a trefoil window in the peak.  The side gables have round-arch windows, and the building is topped by an octagonal cupola with a belled finial.

The house was listed on the National Register of Historic Places in 1989.

Gallery

See also
National Register of Historic Places listings in Somerville, Massachusetts

References

Houses completed in 1855
Houses on the National Register of Historic Places in Somerville, Massachusetts